Emile-Rony Bakale (born 6 October 1987 in Timișoara) is a Romanian-born Republic of the Congo swimmer specializing in freestyle. He swam for the Congo at the 2004, 2008 and 2012 Olympics. He was the Congo's flagbearer in 2004.

He also swam at almost all the World Swimming Championships between 2000 and 2015 and the All-Africa Games between 1999 and 2015.  Bakale is an engineer in Robotics.  His elder sister Monika also swam for the Congo.

References

 Yahoo! Sports profile

1987 births
Living people
Olympic swimmers of the Republic of the Congo
Republic of the Congo male freestyle swimmers
Sportspeople from Timișoara
Swimmers at the 2004 Summer Olympics
Swimmers at the 2008 Summer Olympics
Swimmers at the 2012 Summer Olympics
Swimmers at the 2015 African Games
African Games competitors for the Republic of the Congo